Krueppel-like factor 8 is a protein that in humans is encoded by the KLF8 gene.
KLF8 belongs to the family of KLF protein. KLF8 is activated by KLF1 along with KLF3 while KLF3 represses KLF8.

Interactions 

KLF8 has been shown to interact with CTBP2.

References

Further reading

External links 
 

Transcription factors